Kroksjö is a village of about fifty houses located in Lycksele Municipality, Sweden, about four kilometres west of Lycksele.

Populated places in Lycksele Municipality